Lasgerd Rural District is a rural district (dehestan) in the Central District of Sorkheh County, Semnan Province, Iran. At the 2006 census, its population was 2,135, in 693 families.  The rural district has 21 villages.

References 

Rural Districts of Semnan Province
Sorkheh County